Thai New Zealanders are New Zealanders who are of Thai ancestry and Thailand-born immigrants and their descendants born in New Zealand. There could be as many as 50,000 New Zealanders of Thai descent, with a confirmed Thai-born population of 10,251 in the 2018 census.

In 1961, only 41 people were recorded as having been born in Thailand, but this figure rose to over 6,100 in the 2006 NZ census. Some 500 of these live in Wellington, and have their own temple in Karori

Thai New Zealanders are usually Theravādin Buddhists or, more rarely, Christian.

See also

Demographics of New Zealand
Immigration to New Zealand
History of New Zealand
New Zealand–Thailand relations

References

External links
 Te Ara Encyclopedia of New Zealand: Thais

Asian New Zealander
New Zealand